Carlo Ubaldo Rossi (17 August 1958 – 11 March 2015) was an Italian composer and music producer. He died in a motorcycle accident in the hills of Moncalieri, near Turin.

References

External links 
 Official website
 

1958 births
2015 deaths
Musicians from Munich
Italian composers
Italian male composers
Sanremo Music Festival
Road incident deaths in Italy
20th-century Italian musicians
20th-century Italian male musicians
Motorcycle road incident deaths